Deep Blue Remixes is a collection of remixes created following the release of Deep Blue, the debut collaborative album by Mark Peters and Elliot Ireland, released on 21 October 2016. This collection was released as an EP by the record label Pedigree Cuts (part of Warner/Chappell Production Music). The EP was originally released via Juno Download on 7 October 2016, and featured an exclusive bonus track, ′Cloudsurfing (Engineers Remix).′ The bonus track was no longer available following the full release.

Track listing

Personnel

Mark Peters: Vocals, guitars, bass, sampler/programming.
Elliot Ireland: Guitars, bass, piano, synth.

Additional musicians
Sophie McDonnell: Vocals.
Dan Hewson: Electric piano and piano.
Flavio Carvalho: Drums.
Shawn Lee: Drums on 1.

Producers
Produced, recorded and mixed by Mark Peters and Elliot Ireland at Mark's home in York and Pedigree Cuts Studios, London.

References

External links 
  Fourculture Video Exclusive From Mark Peters and Elliot Ireland
EP listing on EMI Publishing website

2016 EPs